Alexis Ragougneau (born 1973) is a French playwright and novelist.

He has written a number of books: Niels (2017), Évangile pour un gueux (2016) and La Madone de Notre-Dame (2014), which has been translated into English by Katherine Gregor. Niels was one of eight novels in the second selection for the 2017 Prix Goncourt.

References

French writers
Living people
1973 births
Place of birth missing (living people)